The Pospíšil brothers were Czechoslovak players of cycle ball who won a world championship twenty times. Jindřich Pospíšil was born on March 23, 1942, Jan Pospíšil on April 25, 1945, both in Brno, Czechoslovakia.

Before they won their first golden championship medals, Jindřich had already won a silver and bronze with his previous partner Jaroslav Svoboda. Then the brothers together won silver medals at the championship in 1964 in Copenhagen. They won their last championship when Jan was 43 and Jindřich 46 years old.

World champions

 1965, Prague
 1968, Kassel
 1969, Erfurt
 1970, Ostrava
 1971, Baden
 1972, Offenburg
 1973, Vienna
 1974, Heerlen
 1975, Ghent
 1976, Münster
 1977, Brno
 1978, Herning
 1979, Schiltigheim
 1980, Rheinfelden
 1981, Heerlen
 1984, Schiltigheim
 1985, St. Gallen
 1986, Genk
 1987, Herning
 1988, Ludwigshafen

References

External links 
Česká kolová se vrací na stupně vítězů (Czech Radio) 

Czech male cyclists
Living people
Sportspeople from Brno
Sibling duos
Year of birth missing (living people)